Balon is a surname. Notable people with the name include:

 Amanda Balon (born 1997), American actress
 Claude Balon (1671–1744), French dancer and choreographer
 Dave Balon (1938–2007), Canadian ice hockey player and coach
 Eugene K. Balon (1930–2013), Polish Canadian and Czech zoologist and ichthyologist.
 Halina Balon (born 1948), Polish fencer
 Vladimir Balon (1937–2013), Soviet and Russian actor and fencer

See also
Ballon (surname)